Tichilești is a commune located in Brăila County, Muntenia, Romania. It is composed of two villages, Albina and Tichilești.

The commune is home to a youth detention center, the Penitentiary for minors and young people.

Natives
 Constantin Sandu-Aldea

References

Communes in Brăila County
Localities in Muntenia